Urso is a surname. Notable people with the surname include:

Camilla Urso (1840–1902), American violinist
Francesco Urso (born 1994), Italian professional footballer 
Frank Urso (born 1954), American lacrosse player
Joe Urso (born 1979), American football quarterback
Júnior Urso (born 1989), Brazilian footballer
Kirk Urso (1990–2012), American soccer player
Phil Urso (1925—2008), American jazz tenor saxophonist and composer

Surnames from nicknames